Joshua A. Siegel (born September 26, 1966) is an American orthopaedic surgeon and director of sports medicine. He is known for engaging arthroscopic surgical techniques in treating professional athletes and sports teams. He has been listed as Top Doctor six times by New Hampshire magazine. He is listed among the "59 Orthopaedic Surgeons Recommended by Healthcare Leaders". He is also listed among the "125 Knee Surgeons and Specialists to Know".

Early life and education 
Joshua A. Siegel was born in Williamsville, New York. He holds a Bachelor of Science degree from Northwestern University, Chicago, Illinois. He holds a medical degree, summa cum laude, from the State University of New York at Buffalo (SUNY Buffalo), Buffalo, New York. He did his residency in orthopaedic surgery at the SUNY Health Science Center, Syracuse, New York, and his fellowship in sports medicine at the American Sports Medicine Institute, Birmingham, Alabama, under Dr. James Andrews and Dr. William Clancy.

Medical career
Siegel specializes in orthopaedic surgery, sports medicine, arthroscopy, and other surgical related areas. He runs his medical career as a director of sports medicine and orthopaedic surgeon at Access Sports Medicine and Orthopaedics in Exeter, New Hampshire. He was the first physician in the New Hampshire Seacoast region to offer Arthrosurface Nanofactor Flow, a non-invasive pain relief treatment meant for joint inflammation, arthritis and damaged cartilage.

Siegel is a physician for the U.S. Ski Team, US Snowboarding Team, US Olympic committee, US Golf Association Team, professional athletes, and some New Hampshire high school sports teams. He is a founding member of North-east Surgical Care in Newington, New Hampshire. He is a fellow of the American Academy of Orthopaedic Surgeons, and a member of the American Orthopaedic Society for Sports Medicine.

In 2010, Siegel was honored with a Business Excellence Award by New Hampshire Business Review. In 2013, he was recognized among Castle Connolly's Top Doctors for Exeter, New Hampshire region.

See also
 American Orthopaedic Society for Sports Medicine
 Orthopaedic sports medicine

References

1966 births
American orthopedic surgeons
Living people
People from Williamsville, New York
Northwestern University alumni
University at Buffalo alumni
American sports physicians